Fairbanks Township is one of nine townships in Sullivan County, Indiana, United States. As of the 2010 census, its population was 733 and it contained 344 housing units.

History
Fairbanks Township was named for one General Fairbanks.

Geography

Unincorporated towns
 Fairbanks at 
 Riverview at 
 Scott City at 
(This list is based on USGS data and may include former settlements.)

Adjacent townships
 Prairie Creek Township, Vigo County (north)
 Linton Township, Vigo County (northeast)
 Curry Township (east)
 Hamilton Township (southeast)
 Turman Township (south)
 York Township, Clark County, Illinois (west)
 Darwin Township, Clark County, Illinois (northwest)

Cemeteries
The township contains these four cemeteries: Chowning, DeBaun, Pogue and Riggs-Ernest.

Airports and landing strips
 Roll-N-Ridge Airport

School districts
 Northeast School Corporation

Political districts
 Indiana's 8th congressional district
 State House District 45
 State Senate District 39

References
 United States Census Bureau 2008 TIGER/Line Shapefiles
 United States Board on Geographic Names (GNIS)
 IndianaMap

External links
 Indiana Township Association
 United Township Association of Indiana

Townships in Sullivan County, Indiana
Terre Haute metropolitan area
Townships in Indiana